Malibu fire may refer to:
1978 Agoura-Malibu firestorm
Canyon Fire, in October 2007
The Woolsey Fire of November 2018.

See also
Malibu, California
:Category:Fires in California
:Category:Wildfires in California